This article provides an incomplete list of novels set in Gothenburg. Included is the date of first publication.

Twentieth century

1980s
 Simon and the Oaks – Marianne Fredriksson (1985)

1990s
 Hanna's Daughters – Marianne Fredriksson (1994)

Twenty-first century

2000s

2010s
 Skulle jag dö under andra himlar – Johannes Anyuru (2010)

Gothenburg
Gothenburg in popular culture
Gothenburg
Gothenburg
Lists by city
Sweden-related lists